Kazi Zahirul Qayyum is a Bangladesh Awami League politician and former Member of Parliament.

Career
Qayyum was a member of parliament. He was close to Khondaker Mostaq Ahmad. During the Bangladesh Liberation War, he tried to negotiate a truce with Pakistan through the United States that would have prevented the Independence of Bangladesh. He was thwarted by Tajuddin Ahmad.

References

Awami League politicians
Living people
1st Jatiya Sangsad members
Year of birth missing (living people)
Bangladesh Krishak Sramik Awami League central committee members